Coryphopterus tortugae, the patch-reef goby, is a species of goby found in the Western Central Atlantic Ocean.  

References

Gobiidae
Fish of the Atlantic Ocean
Fish described in 1904
Taxa named by David Starr Jordan